Angelique "Angel" Bunner (born November 2, 1989) is an American, former professional softball pitcher. Bunner pitched collegiately for Auburn from 2008 to 2012. In the 2012 NPF Draft, she was drafted seventeenth overall by the Carolina Diamonds. During her professional career in the National Pro Fastpitch, she played for the USSSA Pride, Chicago Bandits, Pennsylvania Rebellion, Carolina Diamonds, NY/NJ Comets and most recently the Beijing Eagles. She currently ranks in career innings pitched and won a Cowles Cup championship with the Bandits in 2016.

Early life
Bunner was born in Fairless Hills, Pennsylvania to George and Debbie Bunner. Bunner has two older siblings. She attended at Conwell-Egan Catholic High School the same school American football running back Steve Slaton attended. At Conwell-Egan Catholic High School, Bunner lettered four times in softball and three in field hockey. Bunner currently has Conwell-Egan records for wins (70), strikeouts (818) and shutouts (38).

Career

College career
Bunner played college softball at Auburn from 2008 to 2012. She set the third-best single-season ERA at 1.53 in 2011, set ninth-best single-season batting average against at .205 in 2011, tied for seventh-most wins in single-season with 16 in 2011, and set single-season record for fewest walks with 22 in 2012.

Bunner recorded eight wins in her freshman season; red shirted her sophomore year due to injury; 7 in her second full season; 16 in her third full year; and 13 in her last season for a career total of 44 wins. In that stretch, Bunner struck out a total of 326 batters.

After Bunner finished college she ranked top ten in several categories, and currently ranks as fourth in WHIP, seventh in ERA, and ninth in wins, shutouts and innings.

Professional career
Bunner was drafted seventeenth overall by the Carolina Diamonds in the 2012 NPF Draft. She was the first Auburn softball player to be taken in the NPF draft.

In February 2013, it was announced that the team had folded and the roster would now be picked up by the NPF expansion team, the New York/New Jersey Comets.

Bunner joined the Chicago Bandits midway through the 2016 season. She was the winning pitcher, pitching in the first six innings of game 3 of the championship series against the USSSA Pride.

Personal life
In 2016, Bunner became a teacher at Belleview High School in Belleview, Florida.

Career statistics

References

External links
 
Angel Bunner Pro FastPitch.com

1989 births
Living people
Softball players from Pennsylvania
Auburn Tigers softball players
Beijing Eagles players
Carolina Diamonds players
Chicago Bandits players
Pennsylvania Rebellion players
USSSA Pride players
Sportspeople from Bucks County, Pennsylvania